Scott Robertson (born 26 November 1987 in Irvine) is a Scottish football defender who plays for Stranraer.

Robertson came on as a substitute during the second half of the 2008 Scottish Cup Final for Queen of the South. before moving to Stirling Albion for the 2009–10 season.

In June 2011, he left Forthbank after being offered a full-time contract by Fram Reykjavik after impressing the club on a week's trial. On 29 July 2011, he signed for Partick Thistle until the end of the 2011–12 season, after the proposed move to Reykjavik fell through, as a result of a change in the terms of the contract.

Robertson signed for Arbroath in the summer of 2012.

He signed for Stranraer in the summer of 2013.

Scott Robertson left Stranraer at the end of the 2017–18 season before joining Airdrieonians on 8 May 2018.

Career statistics

References

External links
 (Queen of the South)
 (Stirling Albion)

1987 births
Living people
Scottish footballers
Queen of the South F.C. players
Stirling Albion F.C. players
Scottish Football League players
Association football midfielders
Partick Thistle F.C. players
Footballers from Irvine, North Ayrshire
Arbroath F.C. players
Stranraer F.C. players
Airdrieonians F.C. players
Scottish Professional Football League players